The women's 50m breaststroke events at the 2019 World Para Swimming Championships were held in the London Aquatics Centre at the Queen Elizabeth Olympic Park in London between 9–15 September.

Medalists

Results

SB3

References

2019 World Para Swimming Championships
2019 in women's swimming